The Michael Jackson Interview: The Footage You Were Never Meant To See is a television documentary released as a rebuttal to Living with Michael Jackson, in which the British journalist Martin Bashir interviewed the American singer Michael Jackson, from May 2002 to January 2003. Jackson felt betrayed by Bashir and stated that the documentary gave a distorted picture of his behavior and conduct as a father.  On February 23, 2003, it aired on Sky One in the United Kingdom, and on FOX in the United States.

Synopsis 
The Michael Jackson Interview: The Footage You Were Never Meant To See, aired on FOX in the United States. NBC reportedly bid $5 million for the footage, but Jackson sold the footage to FOX for $1.6 million. It aired on Sky One in the United Kingdom. It was presented by Maury Povich and contains material which Bashir omitted. It also features new interviews with people close to Jackson, such as his former wife Debbie Rowe, parents Joseph and Katherine, brother Jermaine and close friend Elizabeth Taylor. In this interview, Rowe claimed it was at her request that the children wore masks in public. She also pointed out that the concept of "sharing a bed" can be misunderstood: for example, she herself likes watching television in bed; when she has a visitor, they both watch television together in bed. It also contains interviews with Bashir giving very different statements to what he had previously given in interviews and in the voice-overs. He is shown praising Jackson as a father saying that he thinks it is wonderful that he allows children to come to Neverland.

Reception
In the United States, 14 million watched The Michael Jackson Interview: The Footage You Were Never Meant To See on FOX. The program's United Kingdom debut on Sky One drew more than two million viewers, making it the third-biggest debut in Sky One's history.

References

External links
 

Michael Jackson
2003 television specials
Documentary films about Michael Jackson
Criticism of journalism
Media bias controversies